Mets–Willets Point can refer to the following:
 Mets–Willets Point station (IRT Flushing Line), formerly Willets Point–Shea Stadium, a stop on the New York City Subway
 Mets–Willets Point station (LIRR), formerly Shea Stadium, a stop on the Long Island Railroad
 Mets–Willets Point, a proposed stop on the proposed AirTrain LaGuardia